Ingham is a village and civil parish in the West Lindsey district of Lincolnshire, England. It lies  geographically north of the centre of Lincoln and it can be accessed by taking the B1398 road, which runs parallel to the main A15 (Ermine Street).

History
Ingham is written in the Domesday Book of 1086 as "Ingeham". Possible etymologies are "homestead or village of a man called Inga" or "home of the Inguiones" (an ancient Germanic tribe).

In the Second World War, the village became home to RAF Ingham, a satellite airfield of RAF Hemswell consisting of three grass runways. Three Polish squadrons from 1st Polish Wing were based here, joined later by No. 199 Squadron RAF. In 1944, it was renamed RAF Cammeringham. The station effectively became unusable by 1945 as the short grass runways had deteriorated. After the war, it became home to demobilised Polish aircrew.

Geography

The parish boundary borders with Fillingham two field widths to the north. It follows the southern edge of a small wood at Ancholme Head (in Fillingham), the source of the River Ancholme just west of the A15. It meets West Firsby at the A15 (Ermine Street) which it follows to the south, and meets Spridlington.

North of the curve in the A15, it follows Ingham Lane to the west. It crosses Middle Street at Ingham Cliff, near Ingham Cliff Farm, where there is a weather radar station. To the north along the B1398 is the Windmill public house in the neighbouring parish of Spridlington. The boundary follows the B1398 down Lincoln Cliff, over the crossroads along the road to where it crosses a small drain. It follows the drain northwards past Coates Gorse. To the west is Stow and the Trent Valley.

Amenities

The parish church, located on Church Hill at the east of the village, is dedicated to All Saints. Just to the west of All Saints is a Methodist church. Ingham Primary School is at the south of the village green next to the village hall, and on the opposite side of the green is a small village store. The two village public houses are the Black Horse and the Inn on the Green. A self-catering holiday establishment is located nearby to the Inn on the Green.

Within the parish at the north-east of the village, and on opposite sides of the B1398 road, is a distribution centre (on the former airfield) for an outdoor toy manufacturer and a rescue and boarding kennels. A centre dedicated to the retired RAF Station is open to the public on Sunday mornings; it has a small café and includes information on Ingham's history. A bed and breakfast establishment can be found in the south of the village.

References

External links

 RAF Ingham Heritage Group

Villages in Lincolnshire
Civil parishes in Lincolnshire
West Lindsey District